The 1990 480 km of Dijon was the fifth round of the 1990 World Sportscar Championship season, taking place at Circuit de Dijon-Prenois, France. It took place on July 22, 1990.

Following a heavy accident involving the #14 Richard Lloyd Racing and #26 Obermaier Racing entries on the first lap, the race was red-flagged.  A restart was performed several minutes later, with the race running its original distance.

Official results
Class winners in bold. Cars failing to complete 75% of the winner's distance marked as Not Classified (NC).

† - #29 Chamberlain Engineering was disqualified for taking a short-cut in order to return to the pits.

Statistics
 Pole Position - #1 Team Sauber Mercedes - 1:05.527
 Fastest Lap - #1 Team Sauber Mercedes - 1:08.973
 Average Speed - 182.044 km/h

External links
 WSPR-Racing - 1990 Dijon results

Dijon
Dijon